Yelizarovo may refer to:
Yelizarovo, Naro-Fominsky District, Moscow Oblast, a village in Naro-Fominsky District of Moscow Oblast, Russia
Yelizarovo, Orekhovo-Zuyevsky District, Moscow Oblast, a village in Orekhovo-Zuyevsky District of Moscow Oblast, Russia
Yelizarovo, Shakhovskoy District, Moscow Oblast, a village in Shakhovskoy District of Moscow Oblast, Russia
Yelizarovo, Solnechnogorsky District, Moscow Oblast, a village in Solnechnogorsky District of Moscow Oblast, Russia
Yelizarovo, Nizhny Novgorod Oblast, a village (selo) in Nizhny Novgorod Oblast, Russia
Yelizarovo, name of several other rural localities in Russia